Palazzo Mocenigo may be one of the following palazzos in Venice, Italy, named after the Mocenigo family, seven of whom were Doges of Venice:

 Palazzo Mocenigo di San Stae, Sestiere of Santa Croce
 Palazzi Mocenigo, Sestiere of San Marco:
 Palazzo Mocenigo Casa Nuova
 Palazzo Mocenigo Casa Vecchia
 Palazzo Mocenigo detto "il Nero"
 Palazzo Erizzo Nani Mocenigo, Sestiere of San Marco
 Palazzo Corner Mocenigo, Sestiere of San Polo
 Palazzo Mocenigo alla Giudecca, Giudecca
 Palazzo Mocenigo Gambara, Sestiere of Dorsoduro
 Palazzo Barbarigo Nani Mocenigo, Sestiere of Dorsoduro
 Palazzetto Nani Mocenigo, Sestiere of Dorsoduro
 Casa Foscari Mocenigo,  Sestiere of Castello

External links